The Canton of Nogent is an administrative division of the Haute-Marne department, northeastern France. Its borders were modified at the French canton reorganisation which came into effect in March 2015. Its seat is in Nogent.

It consists of the following communes:
 
Ageville
Andilly-en-Bassigny
Bannes
Biesles
Bonnecourt
Changey
Charmes
Cuves
Dampierre
Esnouveaux
Forcey
Lanques-sur-Rognon
Louvières
Mandres-la-Côte
Marnay-sur-Marne
Neuilly-l'Évêque
Ninville
Nogent
Orbigny-au-Mont
Orbigny-au-Val
Plesnoy
Poinson-lès-Nogent
Poiseul
Poulangy
Rolampont
Sarcey
Thivet
Vesaignes-sur-Marne
Vitry-lès-Nogent

References

Cantons of Haute-Marne